Sundaraja Sitharama Iyengar (born August 26, 1947) is an Indian-born American computer scientist and the Distinguished University Professor, Ryder Professor and Director of Computer Science at Florida International University, Miami, Florida, USA. He also founded and directs the Robotics Research Laboratory at Louisiana State University (LSU). He has been a Visiting Professor or Scientist at Oak Ridge National Laboratory, Jet Propulsion Laboratory, Naval Research Laboratory, and has been awarded the Satish Dhawan Visiting Chaired Professorship at the Indian Institute of Science, the Homi Bhaba Visiting Chaired Professor (IGCAR), and a professorship at the University of Paris (Sorbonne).

Personal life 
S. Sitharama Iyengar was born on 26 August 1947 in Hemmige, a village along the side of Kaveri River situated about 7 km. from Tirumakudal Narsipur in Karnataka.  S. S. Iyengar's father, S.N. Sundaraj Iyengar worked as a Divisional Accountant in the Mysore State Electricity Board, and later moved to Bangalore in 1949. S. S. Iyengar's mother is S. Mahalakshmi.

Education 
Professor Iyengar graduated from University Visvesvaraya College of Engineering (UVCE) in India with a B.S. degree in Mechanical Engineering, and M.S. degree in Mechanical Engineering from the Indian Institute of Science, Bangalore, then a Ph.D. in engineering from Mississippi State University in the United States in 1974. He was a faculty fellow at JPL-Caltech and ASEE faculty fellow at Oak Ridge national Lab. He joined the Computer Science Department as one of the only five faculty members at Louisiana State University. Soon after, he became the department chair and had stayed at the position for 22 years. Meanwhile, Professor Iyengar was very active to collaborate for any research topic with colleagues all over the world.

Research 
Professor Iyengar has been a PI/Co-PI on many NSF, DARPA, and MURI funded projects and has been an active participant in numerous government sponsored studies. He has chaired many international conferences on Distributed Sensor Networks and served on many programming committees on sensor networks around the world. Professor Iyengar has published over 600 research papers in journals and conferences and he has authored, co-authored or edited over 22 books published in MIT Press, John Wiley, Prentice Hall, IEEE Computer Society Press, etc. These publications have been used in major universities all over the world. He has won many Best-Paper Awards sponsored by international conferences and his research publications are on data structures, robotics, parallel computing, and sensor networks. Professor Iyengar has graduated over 55 Ph.D. students, 100 Master's students, many undergraduate students, and large numbers of post-doctoral fellows at various institutions in the world who are now faculty at Major Universities worldwide or scientists or engineers at National Labs / Industries around the world.

Publications 
 Mario Mastriani,Sundaraja Sitharama Iyengar,"Satellite quantum repeaters for a quantum Internet", Willey, pp. 113, 2020.
 Mario Mastriani,Sundaraja Sitharama Iyengar,K. J. Latesh Kumar, "Bidirectional teleportation for underwater quantum communications", Springer Nature 2021, pp. 113, 2020.
 Kianoosh G. Boroojeni, S. S. Iyengar, "Smart Grids: Security and Privacy Issues", Springer Verlag, pp. 113, 2016.
 Buke Ao, Yongcai Wang, Lu Yu, Richard Brooks, S. S. Iyengar, "On Precision Bound of Distributed Fault-Tolerant Sensor Fusion Algorithms". ACM Comput. Surv. 49 (1): 5:1–5:23. May 2016. 
 S. S. Iyengar, Kianoosh G. Boroojeni, "Oblivious Network Routing: Algorithms and Applications", MIT Press, pp 200, March 2015.
 S. S. Iyengar, Kianoosh G. Boroojeni, N. Balakrishnan, "Mathematical Theories of Distributed Sensor Networks", Springer, pp 240, December 2014.
 S. S. Iyengar, S. Mukhopadhyay, C. Steinmuller, and X. Li "Preventing Future Oil Spills with Software-Based event Detection", IEEE Computer, pp: 76–78, August 2010.

Awards 
Professor Iyengar is a member of the European Academy of Sciences, a Life Fellow of the  Institute of Electrical and Electronics Engineers (IEEE), a Fellow of the Association for Computing Machinery(ACM), a Fellow of the American Association for the Advancement of Science (AAAS), a Fellow of the National Academy of Inventors (NAI), a Fellow of the Society for Design and Process Science (SDPS), a Fellow of Institution of Engineers (FIE), a Fellow of the American Institute for Medical and Biological Engineering (AIMBE) and winner of the Lifetime Achievement Award from ISAM-IIT (BHU). He was awarded the Satish Dhawan Chaired Professorship at the Indian Institute of Science (IISc), then Roy Paul Daniels Professorship at LSU. He has received the Distinguished Alumnus Award of the Indian Institute of Science. In 1998, he was awarded the IEEE Computer Society's Technical Achievement Award for the contributions to sensor fusion algorithms, and parallel algorithms and is an IEEE Golden Core Member. He also received the IBM Distinguished Faculty Award, NASA Fellowship Summer Awards at Oakridge National Lab and the Jet Propulsion Laboratory. He is a Village Fellow of the Academy of Transdisciplinary Learning and Advanced Studies in Austin, Texas, 2010.

FuseCPA Algorithm or Brooks Iyengar algorithm was developed in 1996 has proved to be a defining paradigm for his research which has won major awards and has a global impact for generations to come. A case in point is a Test of Time research award was given to Dr. Iyengar in Atlanta recently and is considered to be a benchmark for technology transition in the field of application. This considered to be highest research award by IEEE society in recognition to BI research and its impact on billions of computer and internet users around the world. For this major contribution and for others he has been recognised for his scientific achievement by fellow of many professional organisation such as IEEE, ACM, American association of advancement of science.

Professor Iyengar is an IEEE Distinguished Visitor, SIAM Distinguished Lecturer, and ACM National Lecturer. He has also been awarded honorary Doctorate of Science and Engineering from institutions around the world. He serves on the advisory board of many corporations and universities. Dr. Iyengar received Distinguished Faculty Research Award, from Department of Navy, Naval Research Laboratory, Stennis Space Center, MS.

References

External links 
 Dr. Iyengar's web page, Florida International University, USA
 Dr. Iyengar's web page, Louisiana State University, USA
 
 

Living people
University Visvesvaraya College of Engineering alumni
Indian Institute of Science alumni
Mississippi State University alumni
Indian computer scientists
American computer scientists
Computer science writers
American people of Kannada descent
Fellows of the American Association for the Advancement of Science
Fellows of the Association for Computing Machinery
Fellow Members of the IEEE
Louisiana State University faculty
Florida International University faculty
1947 births
Fellows of the American Institute for Medical and Biological Engineering
Indian emigrants to the United States
American people of Indian descent